Pahute or Pah-Ute or Pah-ute may refer to:
Paiute, Native American people
Pahute Mesa (landform), southern Nevada
Pahute Mesa, test site sub-region at southeast of Pahute Mesa landform
Pahute Mesa Airstrip
Pahute Peak Wilderness, northwest Nevada
Pah-Ute County, Arizona